Jennifer Jean Warnes (born March 3, 1947) is an American singer and songwriter. She has performed as a vocalist on a number of film soundtracks. She has won two Grammy Awards, in 1983 for the Joe Cocker duet "Up Where We Belong" and in 1987 for the Bill Medley duet "(I've Had) The Time of My Life". Warnes also collaborated closely with Leonard Cohen.

Early life
Warnes was born on March 3, 1947, in Seattle, Washington, but raised in Anaheim, California. Her desire and ability to sing came early; at age seven she was offered her first recording contract, which her father declined. She sang in church and local pageants until age 17 when Warnes was offered an opera scholarship to Immaculate Heart College. She was so committed to her Catholic faith, that for a while she entered a convent after graduating from high school.

Warnes chose to sing folk music as it became popularized by Joan Baez in the mid-1960s. In 1968, after a few years with musical theatre and clubs, she signed with Parrot Records (a London Records subsidiary) and recorded her first album. That year, she joined the cast of the television show The Smothers Brothers Comedy Hour.

Early in her career, industry advisors suggested Warnes change her name to "Warren", but then realized that there was already an actress named Jennifer Warren, so she performed briefly as simply 'Jennifer', though she was credited as Jennifer Warren when she provided duet vocals for singer-guitarist Mason Williams on his 1968 album, The Mason Williams Ear Show. Soon, however, she returned to her birth name.

In November 1968, Warnes (as "Jennifer Warren") portrayed the female lead in the Los Angeles, California, production of the stage musical Hair. She had a related UK single release as "Jennifer" on London HLU 10278 in June 1969 with "Let The Sunshine In" and "Easy to Be Hard", licensed from the US Parrot label.

Career

1970s
In 1971, Warnes met Canadian songwriter and poet Leonard Cohen, and the two remained friends. She toured Europe with Cohen's band in 1972 and 1979 — first as a back-up singer and then as a vocal arranger and guest singer on Cohen's albums Live Songs (1973), Recent Songs (1979), Various Positions (1985), I'm Your Man (1988), The Future (1992), Field Commander Cohen: Tour of 1979 (2001), and Old Ideas (2012). Warnes later (1987) recorded a critically acclaimed audiophile album of Cohen songs, Famous Blue Raincoat.

In 1972, Warnes released her third album, Jennifer, which was produced by John Cale. It was unavailable after the LP was deleted, until it was finally reissued in Japan in 2013 (Reprise WPCR-14865). In 1976, Warnes released the album Jennifer Warnes (Arista 4062), which contained her breakthrough single, "Right Time of the Night", which hit number 1 on Billboard's Easy Listening (Adult Contemporary) chart in April 1977 and number 6 on the Billboard Hot 100 chart in May 1977.

Warnes recorded the song "It Goes Like It Goes" for the 1979 motion picture Norma Rae. The song won the Academy Award for Best Original Song. Her 1979 single "I Know A Heartache When I See One", was a Top 10 Country hit and reached the Top 20 on both the Pop and Adult Contemporary charts.

1980s
Warnes recorded the Randy Newman composition "One More Hour" for the 1981 motion picture Ragtime. This became her second song performance nominated for the Academy Award for Best Original Song.

Warnes teamed up with Joe Cocker to record "Up Where We Belong" for the 1982 motion picture An Officer and a Gentleman. Written by Buffy Sainte-Marie, Will Jennings and Jack Nitzsche, the song won the Academy Award for Best Original Song, as well as a Golden Globe Award. The song also won Warnes and Cocker the Grammy Award for Best Pop Performance by a Duo or Group with Vocal, which was released as a single and hit No. 1 (for three weeks running) on the Billboard Hot 100 chart. It was certified platinum for over two million sales in the United States. That same year, she recorded James Taylor's "Millworker" for the American Playhouse PBS production of Working.

In 1985, she recorded a duet version with B. J. Thomas of the song "As Long As We Got Each Other", the theme for the TV show Growing Pains. It was used as the opening theme for the second and third seasons. For the fourth season, the song was once again re-recorded with Thomas and Dusty Springfield. However, the Warnes version made its return for the fifth season and the seventh (final) season of the show. The same year, she recorded vocals for Leonard Cohen's record Various Positions, getting equal vocals credits with Cohen in the inside booklet. After releasing a praised tribute LP of Leonard Cohen's songs in 1987, Famous Blue Raincoat, to which Cohen contributed two new compositions, "First We Take Manhattan", which featured Stevie Ray Vaughan on guitar, and "Ain't No Cure for Love", she contributed vocals to Cohen's 1988 hit LP I'm Your Man, most notably to "Take This Waltz" and "Tower of Song".

Warnes teamed with Bill Medley to record "(I've Had) The Time of My Life" for the 1987 motion picture Dirty Dancing. This marked the third song performed by Warnes to win the Academy Award for Best Original Song and second for the Golden Globe Award in the same category. The song also won Warnes and Medley the Grammy Award for Duo or Group with Vocal. It reached No. 1 on the Billboard Hot 100 and spent four consecutive weeks at No. 1 on the Adult Contemporary chart.

On September 30, 1987, at the Coconut Grove in Los Angeles, she contributed vocals for Roy Orbison's star-studded television special Roy Orbison and Friends, A Black and White Night.

1990s to present
In 1991, Warnes recorded the Lennon-McCartney song "Golden Slumbers" as a duet with Jackson Browne, included in the album For Our Children which was released by Disney as a benefit for the Pediatric AIDS Foundation.

Warnes released her seventh studio album, The Hunter, in June 1992. The LP featured the AC No. 13 single "Rock You Gently", and also featured the track "Way Down Deep" co-written by Warnes and Leonard Cohen. She recorded the track "Cold Enough To Snow" for the 1993 film, Life With Mikey.

In August 2007, the Shout Factory Records label re-released the 20th anniversary edition of Famous Blue Raincoat with a 24-page booklet and four additional songs. The Hunter was re-released in 2009, and The Well was re-released in September 2010.

All remasters were issued on high quality vinyl and 24K gold discs. Famous Blue Raincoat was released with four bonus tracks. The Hunter was released without bonus material. The re-released The Well, however, contains a total of 14 tracks. These include two previously unreleased recordings from the original session: "La Luna Brilla", "A Fool for the Look (in Your Eyes)", and one extra bonus selection, "Show Me the Light" (a second duet with Bill Medley, which was originally featured on the 1998 movie soundtrack Rudolph the Red Nosed Reindeer-The Movie).

In 2018, Warnes released her first album since 2001, Another Time, Another Place. The first cut from the new album, "Just Breathe" was released on March 1, 2018.  Written by Eddie Vedder, the song was originally recorded by Pearl Jam. The album includes 10 tracks, among them a new version of "So Sad" by Mickey Newbury, "I Am The Big Easy" by Ray Bonneville, "Once I Was Loved" by John Legend, "Why Worry" by Mark Knopfler, and "The Boys And Me" by Warnes herself and Michael Smotherman.

Discography

Albums

Singles

Compilation albums 
 Best of Jennifer Warnes – Arista, 1982 – US No. 47
 Just Jennifer – Deram (Germany), 1992
 Best: First We Take Manhattan – unauthorized (Germany), 2000
 Platinum and Gold Collection – with errors in actual tracks, not Warnes singing, 2004 (recalled)
 Love Lifts Us Up: A Collection 1968-83 – Raven (Australia), 2004

Other media appearances

Awards and nominations

Notes

References

External links 
 Official site
 
 

1947 births
Living people
American women country singers
American country rock singers
Grammy Award winners
Leonard Cohen
Musicians from Seattle
Songwriters from Washington (state)
Singers from Los Angeles
Songwriters from California
Singers from Washington (state)
Private Music artists
20th-century American women singers
20th-century American singers
21st-century American singers
21st-century American women singers